Phase II Pan Groove is a steel orchestra from Trinidad and Tobago.

Band
Phase II Pan Groove was formed in August 1972 by a group of seven innovative musicians (Barry Howard, Rawle Mitchell, Andy Phillip, Selwyn Tarradath, Ian Clyde Gibson, Noel Seon and Len "Boogsie" Sharpe) seeking to produce a more creative sound on pan, by experimenting not only with different types of music, but also with the combined effects of contemporary instruments and pan.

These six musicians broke off from Starlift in order to become professional panmen. They bought some pans of their own from money they saved while in Starlift and, along with tuners Lennox Granger and Mikey Phillip, took up residence on Hamilton Street, Woodbrook, opposite the Tarradath residence. To this day, the band still practises there in what is now affectionately known as "the Village."

Phase II remained an un-sponsored steel orchestra until 1999, when a sponsorship agreement was signed between the band and the oil company Petrotrin.

Undoubtedly, the most outstanding feature about Phase II Pan Groove is the fact that, from its inception, the bold decision was taken to pioneer the performing of original compositions in steelband competitions. At the national Panorama competitions, Phase II consistently elected to perform pieces specifically composed and arranged for the instrument by its charismatic leader and musical director, "Boogsie."

Despite this calculated disadvantage, Phase II, after an initial period of non-acceptance, was able to gain some recognition as from 1977, when the band captured its first North Zonal title, and thereafter emerged as Champions of the North for a then unprecedented four consecutive years (1986–1989), eventually creating history in 1987 by becoming the first un-sponsored band to win the national Panorama competition, as well as the first band to do so performing its own tune. This feat was repeated in 1988, and from that year to 1993, the band was in the top three positions except for 1991.

The band's arranger, Len Sharpe was away in 1994 and 1995, but returned in 1996 and led the band to Panorama victories in 2005, 2006, 2008, 2013 and 2014. 
Phase II/Len Sharpe is the only team that qualified for all finals from 1981 to Present and now has 7 wins, placed second 12 times and in third place four times.

At the Steelband Musical Festival, "Boogsie" has been dubbed the Mozart of Pan by foreign adjudicators, as his compositions have been able to stand alongside those of the great classical masters. This was evident at the Festival of 1986, when the band captured third place, performing "Dance of the Douens", composed by "Boogsie".

Over the years, Phase II has toured extensively throughout North America, the Caribbean, Europe and Japan, and its Musical Director, generally regarded as the world's premier pannist, along with his acknowledged genius as a composer and arranger, has toured extensively around the world as a solo artiste, sharing stages with some of the world's greatest jazz musicians.

References
 

Trinidad and Tobago musical groups
Steelbands
Port of Spain
Musical groups established in 1972
1972 establishments in North America